Fort Point Light may refer to:

Fort Point Light (San Francisco), California, U.S.
Fort Point Light (Maine), U.S.
Fort Point Light (Texas), U.S.
Fort Point Lighthouse (Nova Scotia), Canada

See also

Portsmouth Harbor Light, New Castle, New Hampshire, U.S.